Rune Peder Lindstrøm (born 2 March 1963 in Oslo, Norway) was the first drummer in the Norwegian rock-band deLillos (1984–1985). He left in 1985 and stayed away until 2006, when he again entered the drum-chair of the band, which is now back to the original constitution.

Rune Lindstrøm is the man behind "Lys", one of the songs in the Norwegian finale for the Eurovision Song Contest of 1997. The song was performed by the artist Manjari. It was released by Virgin Records as a promotion-CD only. The quality and originality of the song, has made it one of the most sought-after objects among Eurovision-fans.

Rune Lindstrøm was a member of the Norwegian band Blister in 2003 and participated on the album "Brand New Antiques".

Rune Lindstrøm is the brother of Morgan Lindstrøm of synth-duo Langsomt Mot Nord.

References

Sources in Norwegian 
 Rune Lindstrøm Wikipedia
 Rune Lindstrøm Rockipedia

Living people
1963 births
Norwegian rock drummers
Male drummers
Musicians from Oslo